Butte Creek may refer to:
Helltown, California or Butte Creek, an unincorporated community in Butte County, California
Butte Creek (Butte County, California), a Sacramento River tributary
Butte Creek (Siskiyou County, California), a Klamath River tributary
Butte Creek (Oregon), a Pudding River tributary

See also
Little Butte Creek, a Rogue River tributary in Jackson and Klamath counties, Oregon
Big Butte Creek, a Rogue River tributary in Jackson County, Oregon